Sampath Lakmal de Silva ( – July 2, 2006) was a Sri Lankan Freelance press and television journalist specialising in defense articles and wrote for various publications including Irudina, Lakbima, Sathdina and TNL and he also worked for various television channels earlier he was the defense correspondent for now-defunct Sathdina Weekly. He was found shot dead in Dehiwela in Colombo.

Background
Sampath Lakmal de Silva was supposed to have possessed sensitive information regarding defense personnel and there had been threats to him in the past. He was a well known and reliable informant on defense matters. There are reports he was a double agent for both the Sri Lankan Intelligence and the LTTE but there is no clear evidence on this. Upcountry Peoples' Front (UPF), P. Radhakrishnan said that Sampath Lakmal de Silva had information about killing done by the army.

Incident
Sampath Lakmal de Silva received phones and went to meet defense personnel whom he knew very well and his mother Rupa de Silva overhead him greeting the person at the other end as Kumar Sir and it was later revealed he had met one Lieutenant Kumara. Later his body was found in Dehiwela gunned down.

Reaction
The International Federation of Journalists condemned the murder:

Government investigation
Sri Lankan defense personnel were questioned.

See also
Sri Lankan civil war
Human Rights in Sri Lanka
Notable assassinations of the Sri Lankan Civil War

References

External links
Sri Lanka mission report
 Nine recommendations for improving media freedom in Sri Lanka – RSF
Media in Sri Lanka
Free Speech in Sri Lanka

1980s births
2006 deaths
Deaths by firearm in Sri Lanka
Assassinated Sri Lankan journalists
Assassinated Sri Lankan activists
People murdered in Sri Lanka
Unsolved murders in Sri Lanka